Slip-cueing is a turntable-based DJ technique which consists of holding a record still while the platter rotates underneath the slipmat and releasing it at the right moment. In this way the record attains the right speed almost immediately, with no need to wait for the heavy platter to accelerate.

Slip-cueing was introduced to the disco scene by Francis Grasso, but the technique had been used for many years in the radio broadcast industry; it was often used by radio stations to match a following song to the preceding song, preserving the beat. Grasso used this method to great effect in order to create a continuous flow of music for a nightclub dance floor.

See also
 Beatmatching

Sources
Jones, Alan and Kantonen, Jussi (1999). Saturday Night Forever: The Story of Disco. Chicago, Illinois: A Cappella Books. .
Goldman, Albert, (1978). Disco. New York, New York: Hawthorn Books. .

DJing